The L21A1 RARDEN ("Royal Armament, Research and Development Establishment" and  "Enfield") is a British 30 mm autocannon used as a combat vehicle weapon. The Royal Armament Research and Development Establishment (RARDE) and the Royal Small Arms Factory (RSAF), were part of the Ministry of Defence, at the time.

Design
The weapon uses a long recoil system of operation, for minimum recoil forces on the mounting and vehicle. Spent cases are ejected forwards. The weapon was also designed for minimum inboard length, allowing for more space in the turret or a smaller turret. Another feature is that no gun gas escapes into the turret.

The cartridge case used is 170 mm in length and is based on the Hispano-Suiza 831-L round. Unlike the belt-fed or drum-fed systems on many vehicle weapons, Rarden is loaded manually with three-round clips. Each 3-round clip is loaded into the magazine as a unit, similar to the 4-round clips of the Bofors 40 mm gun. The magazine can hold two 3-round clips at a time. This limits its capacity for automatic fire. The Rarden gun does not require an external power source and can remain in action even if the vehicle is disabled, provided that provision is made for manual traverse and elevation of the turret or mount and for sighting the weapon.

Manufacture
The RSAF Enfield manufactured the Rarden from the early 1970s. However the RSAF was incorporated within the Royal Ordnance Factories in the early 1980s, in the run up to their privatisation, becoming part of Royal Ordnance. Royal Ordnance (RO) planned to close Enfield and several other sites after privatisation. British Aerospace (BAe) bought Royal Ordnance on 2 April 1987 and the closure of RSAF Enfield was announced on 12 August 1987. Most of RO Enfield's work was moved, prior to the closure of the RSAF, to RO Nottingham. Manufacture of the RARDEN was carried out at British Manufacture and Research Company BMARC from 1985. This company was purchased by BAe in 1992, becoming part of RO Defence; this organisation is now renamed BAE Systems Global Combat Systems Munitions.

Service use
The Rarden is, or has been, fitted to a number of armoured vehicles in the British Army:
 FV721 Fox armoured car
 FV107 Scimitar tracked reconnaissance vehicle (part of the Combat Vehicle Reconnaissance (Tracked) or CVR(T) range)
 Sabre – FV101 Scorpion with turrets taken from Fox Armoured cars (also in the CVR(T) range)
 FV510 Warrior infantry fighting vehicle, and some of its variants

The Rarden was also intended to be fitted to the FV432 armoured personnel carrier but when fitted with Rarden and its turret there was too little room left for the infantry. Thirteen vehicles were fitted with the Fox turret to be experimental fire support vehicles. There were problems with the long-barrelled weapon fouling external fittings (which meant that the turret had to be mounted on a three-inch spacer) and with blast damage to the flotation screen. They were deployed with the Berlin Infantry Brigade.

Replacement
In March 2008, the UK Ministry of Defence announced that a 40 mm weapon firing Cased Telescoped Ammunition developed by the Anglo-French firm CTA International had been selected to replace Rarden in the Warrior IFV and to be fitted to the reconnaissance vehicle which would replace the existing range of CVR(T) vehicles.

Specifications

 Cartridge: 30×170mm
 Calibre: 30mm
 Overall length: 
 Barrel length: 
 Inboard length: 
 Complete weight: 
 Barrel weight: 
 Ammunition: Armour Piercing Secondary Effect (APSE), High Explosive Incendiary (HEI), Armour Piercing Discarding Sabot (APDS)
 Muzzle velocity:
 APSE, HEI: 1070 m/s
 APDS: 1175 m/s
 Range:

References

Further reading
 Pam, David (1998). The Royal Small Arms Factory Enfield & its Workers. Enfield: privately published by the author. .

30 mm artillery
Autocannon
Vehicle weapons
Artillery of the United Kingdom